Very Special is the debut album by Debra Laws, released in 1981 on Elektra Records.

The album peaked at No. 70 on the Billboard 200 and No. 13 on Billboard's Top Black Albums chart. The title track and "Be Yourself" are top 40 hits on Billboard's Hot Soul Singles chart.

Track listing

Personnel
Debra Laws - lead vocals
Gwen Matthews - backing vocals (2, 4, 6-8)
Marlena Jeter - backing vocals (2, 4, 6-8)
David Lasley - backing vocals (2)
Eloise Laws - backing vocals (5)
Arnold McCuller - backing vocals (2)
Alexandra Brown - backing vocals (7)
Stephanie Hayes - backing vocals (7)
Nathan East – bass (1-2, 4-5, 7-8)
Alex Smith – bass (3)
Welton Gite – bass (6)
Leon "Ndugu" Chancler – drums (1-2, 5, 7)
Darryl Clifton – drums (3)
Raymond Pounds – drums (4, 6)
Roland Bautista - guitar (except 3)
Melvin Robinson - guitar (3)
Arthur Adams - guitar (3, 7)
Pat Kelley - guitar (5)
Bobby Lyle - keyboards (except 3)
Michael Robinson - keyboards (3)
Larry Dunn – synthesizer (1, 4-6, 8)
Ronnie Laws - saxophone (1, 3-4), duet vocals (3) [uncredited]
Hubert Laws - flute (4)

Production
Producer: Hubert Laws, Ronnie Laws
Engineer: Gerry E. Brown
Photography: Ron Slenzak

Charts

Weekly charts

Year-end charts

Singles

References

External links

1981 albums
Elektra Records albums